Taleb Larbi District is a district of El Oued Province, Algeria. As of the 2008 census, it has a population of 15,130. It is the largest district by area, but the smallest by population, in the province. Its three communes have the highest population growth rates in the province.

Communes 

Taleb Larbi District consists of three communes:
 Taleb Larbi
 Ben Guecha
 Douar El Ma

References 

Districts of El Oued Province